History of the world may refer to:
 Human history, the recorded memory of human experience.
 History of the World (book), a 1944 book edited by William Nassau Weech
 "The History of the World (Part 1)", a 1980 song by The Damned
 History of the World, Part I, a 1981 film by Mel Brooks
History of the World, Part II, 2023 TV series
 History of the World (board game), a 1991 board game designed by Gary Dicken and Steve Kendall
 History of the World (video game), a 1997 computer game adaptation of the board game
 Andrew Marr's History of the World, a 2012 BBC documentary television series presented by Andrew Marr.
 History of the Entire World, I Guess, a 2017 video by Bill Wurtz

See also
 World history (disambiguation), a field of study
 A History of the World (disambiguation)
 Geologic time scale, the geological history of Earth
 History of Earth, the natural history of the planet Earth
 Universal History (disambiguation)
 Human evolution, the origins of humanity
 Recorded history, the part of human history that has been recorded by the use of language
 Timeline of evolution, the biological history of life on the planet Earth
 Timelines of world history, detailing recorded events since the creation of writing to the present day
 Timeline of the Big Bang, detailing the history of the universe
 A Little History of the World
 A Short History of the World (disambiguation)